Všichni proti všem is a 1977 Czechoslovak comedy film directed by Karel Steklý.

Cast
 Vladimír Šmeral
 Eduard Dubský
 Jiřina Bohdalová
 Vladimír Ráž
 Stanislava Bartošová
 Josef Vinklář
 Kateřina Macháčková
 Břetislav Slováček

References

External links
 

1977 films
1977 comedy films
Czechoslovak comedy films
1970s Czech-language films
Films directed by Karel Steklý
Czech comedy films
1970s Czech films